Ruan Ackermann (born 29 December 1995) is a South African professional rugby union player, currently playing in the  English Premiership with Gloucester. His regular position is flanker.

Club career

2012–2014 : Youth

Ackermann played high school rugby for Hoërskool Garsfontein, where he featured for their first XV from 2012 to 2014, also captaining them in 2014, where he helped them reach the final of the Beeld Trophy.

Despite still being at school, he was included in the  squad during the 2014 Under-19 Provincial Championship and was named on the bench for three of their matches. He played off the bench on all three occasions and marked his debut – a Round Ten match against  in Johannesburg – by scoring a try in a 28–8 victory.

2015 : Vodacom Cup and Under-21

Ackermann was named in the  squad for the 2015 Vodacom Cup. The Golden Lions finished top of the Northern Section, winning all seven of their matches to qualify for the Quarter Finals.

Ackermann was named in a 37-man South Africa Under-20 training squad in March 2015, but missed out on selection for their final squad for the 2015 World Rugby Under 20 Championship.

He made six appearances for the  team during the 2015 Under-21 Provincial Championship Group A, scoring a try in his side's 17–30 defeat to the s as they finished in fourth position on the log to qualify for the semi-finals, but didn't feature in the semi-final match which was won 43–20 by eventual champions .

2016–2017 : Super Rugby

He was named on the bench for their opening match against the Sunwolves.

2017 : Move to Gloucester

In August 2017, Gloucester Rugby announced the signing of Ackermann, whose father Johan had recently joined as head coach.

International career
Ackermann played for the Barbarians against South Africa XV in a non-cap friendly, held at the Wembley Stadium in London, England. He also played against Fiji, Czech Republic and New Zealand XV in non-cap friendlies.

He was included in the South Africa 'A' side in a two-test series against French Barbarians, also coached under his father, Johan Ackermann.

Personal life

He is the son of Johan Ackermann, a former provincial rugby player who also made thirteen appearances for the South African national team. After finishing his playing career, Johan Ackermann became a coach at the  Currie Cup side and the  Super Rugby side.

References

External links

Profile on itsrugby.co.uk

1995 births
Living people
Expatriate rugby union players in England
Gloucester Rugby players
Golden Lions players
Lions (United Rugby Championship) players
Rugby union flankers
Rugby union locks
Rugby union players from Pretoria
South African expatriate rugby union players
South African expatriate sportspeople in England
South African rugby union players